Ruth Schnapp  (September 19, 1926 – January 1, 2014) was a structural engineer and equal rights activist. A Masters graduate of Stanford University she became the first woman to become licensed as a structural engineer in California.

After spending almost 30 years working for the California state architect's office, Schnapp set up her own consultancy business where she practised until retirement in 2001.

Schnapp was also active in support of equal rights including the protest at the Pacific Stock Exchange on August 26, 1980.

References

 

American structural engineers
Engineers from Washington (state)
Activists from Seattle
Stanford University School of Engineering alumni
1926 births
2014 deaths